The Club Africain Men's Volleyball Club (Arabic: النادي الافريقي للكرة الطائرة, English:  African Club or CA) was a volleyball team based in the Tunisian capital Tunis which was part of the omnisport Club Africain. Founded in 1943, it competed in the Tunisian Men's Volleyball League where it enjoyed some success, especially in the 1980s and 1990s.

Due to economic issues, the team was dissolved in 2001.

Honours

National titles

 Tunisian Volleyball League 7 :
 Champions : 1980–81, 1982–83, 1988–89, 1989–90, 1990–91, 1991–92, 1993–94
 Vice Champion : 1981–82, 1983–84, 1986–87, 1992–93, 1995–96,

 Tunisian Volleyball Cup 5 :
 Champions : 1982–83, 1983–84, 1989–90, 1990–91, 1991–92
 Runners Up :  1977–78, 1981–82

International titles

 African Champions Cup 3 :
 Champions : 1991, 1992, 1993

 African Cup Winners' Cup 1 :
 Champions : 1992
 Runners Up : 1991
 Bronze medal : 1993

 FIVB Club World Championship
 Best Performance 7th Place : 1991, 1992

Regional Titles

 Arab Clubs Championship 2 :
 Champions : 1992, 1994
 Runners Up : 1995

Last Squad 2001

Notable players

 Moncef Belaïba
 Fayçal Ben Amara
 Rached Ben Krid
 Hédi Boussarsar
 Rachid Boussarsar
 Abdelaziz Derbel
 Zied Elloumi
 Anis Fazaa
 Riadh Hedhili
 Adel Kechini
 Mohamed Kerkeni
 Lotfi M'douki
 Abderrazak Miladi
 Moncef Selmi
 Edith Serfati
 Chemseddine Soyah
 Bahri Trabelsi

See also
Club Africain (football)
Club Africain (basketball)
Club Africain (handball)
Club Africain Women's Handball
Club Africain Women's Volleyball

External links
Official website 
Club Africain on Instagram

Tunisian volleyball clubs
Volleyball clubs established in 1943
1943 establishments in Tunisia
Volleyball clubs disestablished in 2001
2001 disestablishments in Tunisia
Sport in Tunis